The 1968–69 NBA season was the Bucks' inaugural season in the NBA.

Expansion Draft

Draft picks

Roster

Regular season

Season standings

x – clinched playoff spot

Record vs. opponents

Game log

Player statistics

Transactions

Trades

Free Agents

References

Milwaukee
Milwaukee Bucks seasons
Milwau
Milwau